Tomas Bernardo Rodrigues Sousa (born May 16, 1987) is a Portuguese rally driver.

Born in Madeira, Portugal, and having previously competed in karting, Sousa began his rally career in 2006, competing in the Portuguese national championship. In 2008 he began competing in the Production World Rally Championship (P-WRC), a class of the World Rally Championship. He finished second in class on the 2008 Acropolis Rally, finishing the season ninth in the P-WRC standings. In 2009 he switched from a Mitsubishi Lancer Evolution IX to an Abarth Grande Punto, finishing the season in tenth. In 2010 he moves to the new Super 2000 World Rally Championship (S-WRC) in a Ford Fiesta S2000, winning his class in his first rally in the S2000, the 2011 Jordan Rally.

Racing record

WRC results

PWRC results

SWRC results

WRC 2 results

Drive DMACK Cup results

IRC results

Big Brother
In 2022 Sousa enters the reality show Big Brother Famosos 2022 II as a rally driver, and he ends up winning it after 57 days.

References

1987 births
Living people
People from Madeira
Portuguese rally drivers
Intercontinental Rally Challenge drivers
European Rally Championship drivers